Abdulrahman Sewehli, also spelt as Abdel Rahman al-Suwayhili,  is a Libyan politician and the leader of the Union for the Homeland party. He was elected as chairman of the High Council of State on 6 April 2016.

He is the grandson of one of the prominent Tripolitanian nationalist Ramadan Asswehly and one of the founders of the Tripolitanian Republic.

References

1946 births
Libyan people of Turkish descent 
Libyan politicians
Living people
People from Misrata